Oi Agapes Fevgoun, Ta Tragoudia Menoun is the eleventh studio album by Mando. It was released in December 2003 and has gone Platinum in Greece. It is a double CD; on the first CD, Mando sings old Greek successful songs and on the second CD, she performs five new songs.

Track listing

Disc 1
 "Pia Matia Se Koitazoune" - 3:20
 "Kardia Mou Ego" - 3:25
 "Pia Nihta S' Eklepse" - 3:26
 "Ela" - 3:22
 "Pali Tha Klapso" - 3:18
 "Ola Dika Sou" - 4:13
 "Tis Ores Pou Se Thelo" - 3:51
 "Min Ta Filas Ta Matia Mou" - 3:44
 "Ftaime Ki Oi Dio" - 3:33
 "Me Ti Kardia Ton Kosmo N' Arnitho" - 3:38
 "Itan Mia Fora Ki Ena Kero" - 3:06
 "Otan" - 3:10
 "Dos Mou T' Athanato Nero" - 3:49
 "To Palio Roloi" - 3:31

Disc 2
 "Fainetai" - 4:41
 "S' Anazito" - 5:27
 "Eisai Sti Zoi Mou" - 4:09
 "De Me Afora" - 5:05
 "To Teleftaio Fili" - 4:28

Video clips
"Fainetai", which was also a radio single.

2003 albums
Greek-language albums
Mando (singer) albums